Michael Handley (born 29 December 1946 Dudley) known as Mick Handley is a former speedway rider from England.

Speedway career 
Mick was about 16 when he bought a speedway bike, which he used to push across fields to a cycle speedway track where he started to learn to ride. When he first rode at Cradley in second half rides, he had no transport and he would push the bike the two miles from home to the track, which he did several times before a lift was organised for him. A neighbour would give him lifts to Wolverhampton until he had an ultimatum to decide on which club he would ride for. As Wolves were about to tour in Italy and offered him a place on the team, he signed without hesitation.
Handley rode in the top two tiers of British Speedway from 1966 to 1982, riding for various clubs. In 1968, he topped the league averages during the 1968 British League Division Two season.
When Oxford Speedway was rescued from closure in 1976, Mick was one of the first riders to represent the reformed Oxford Cheetahs under promoters Harry Bastable and Tony Allsopp.  His last professional race was in 1983 at Oxford

After speedway
He had still remained a builder by trade throughout his career and returned to housebuilding full time after hanging up his leathers. Lives in Dudley with wife, Arlene, and is a father and grandfather. To keep fit, he uses a gym and does boxing training. No longer with any involvement with speedway, he is a Wolverhampton Wanderers supporter

References 

Living people
1946 births
British speedway riders
Cradley Heathens riders
Crayford Kestrels riders
Long Eaton Archers riders
Oxford Cheetahs riders
Scunthorpe Scorpions riders
Swindon Robins riders
Stoke Potters riders
West Ham Hammers riders
Wolverhampton Wolves riders
Sportspeople from Dudley